Štajner (Slavic form of German Steiner) may refer to:
Jiří Štajner (born 1976), Czech football striker
Karlo Štajner (1902–1992), Yugoslavian communist activist and author of Austrian origin